Sorghastrum secundum is a species of grass known by the common name lopsided Indiangrass. It is native to the Southeastern United States.

The ligule is pointed. The inflorescence is one-sided.

This plant provides forage for livestock. It grows best on well-drained soils.  It is a larval host plant to the pepper-and-salt skipper.

References

Andropogoneae
Flora of the Southeastern United States